Fitchburg may refer to:

Places in the United States of America
 Fitchburg, California
 Fitchburg, Kentucky
 Fitchburg, Massachusetts
 Fitchburg, Michigan
 Fitchburg, Wisconsin

Transportation
Fitchburg Railroad, named for the Massachusetts city
Fitchburg (MBTA station), current station
Fitchburg Line, the train line which ends there